Ciscissus or Kiskisos was a town and bishopric of ancient Cappadocia. In Roman and Byzantine times the town's name was sometimes shortened to Cissus and belonged to the Roman province of Cappadocia Prima. It became a Christian bishopric, a suffragan of the metropolitan see of Caesarea in Cappadocia,  the capital of the province. The names of two of its bishops are known from extant contemporary documents: Plato was at the Trullan Council of 692, and Soterichus at the Second Council of Nicaea in 787. No longer a residential bishopric, Ciscissus is today listed by the Catholic Church as a titular see.

Its site is located near Yaylacık, Asiatic Turkey.

References

Populated places in ancient Cappadocia
Roman towns and cities in Turkey
Former populated places in Turkey
Populated places of the Byzantine Empire
History of Kayseri Province
Catholic titular sees in Asia